Debbie Rush (born 29 March 1966) is an English actress, known for portraying the role of Anna Windass in the ITV soap opera Coronation Street from 2008 to 2018.

Career

Early career
After training at the Manchester School of Acting when she was in her thirties, she has also starred in Shameless, Brookside and Hollyoaks in the City. Rush also filmed the role of Pam in the horror film Salvage alongside Neve McIntosh.

Coronation Street
In 2008, Rush was cast in soap opera Coronation Street as Anna Windass. She won the part over a number of highly rated actors. Of this Rush said: "I went for the casting a few months ago and then was called back for the screen test. When I got the part I couldn’t believe it, I was thrilled to bits. I watched Corrie all the time growing up and all the family are tuning in now that I’m going to be in it.  It’s surreal, because the cast and characters are already part of your life just from watching it." In March 2015, Rush was nominated in the category of "Best Actress" at The British Soap Awards 2015.

Rush announced her decision to leave the series in July 2017 and Anna departed in the episode first broadcast on 22 January 2018. She appeared in two further episodes first broadcast on 31 May to 1 June 2018.

Further roles
Since leaving Coronation Street, Rush appeared in Sky One original Brassic for two episodes in 2019 and another in 2021 and alongside Steve Pemberton and Reece Shearsmith in series 5 of BBC One anthology series Inside Number 9.

Other ventures
In December 2010, Rush released her own fitness DVD, Debbie Rush's Bulge Buster Workout.

Personal life
Rush and husband Andrew have three children, Tom, Poppy and William.

Filmography

References

External links

1966 births
Living people
English television actresses
English soap opera actresses
People from Castleton, Derbyshire
Actresses from Greater Manchester